The governor-general of Solomon Islands is the vice-regal representative of the Solomon Islands' monarch, currently King Charles III, in Solomon Islands. The governor-general is appointed by the monarch after their nomination by the National Parliament by vote, although the monarch is not bound to accept that nomination for appointment. The functions of the governor-general include appointing ministers, judges, and ambassadors; giving royal assent to legislation passed by parliament; and issuing writs for election.

In general, the governor-general observes the conventions of the Westminster system and responsible government, maintaining a political neutrality, and has to always act only on the advice of the prime minister. The governor-general also has a ceremonial role: hosting events at the official residenceGovernment House in the capital, Honiaraand bestowing honours to individuals and groups who are contributing to Solomon Islands and their communities. When travelling abroad, the governor-general is seen as the representative of Solomon Islands and its monarch.

Governors-general are appointed for a five-year term of office. Since 7 July 2019, the governor-general has been Sir David Vunagi.

The office of the governor-general was created on 7 July 1978, when Solomon Islands gained independence from the United Kingdom as a sovereign state and an independent constitutional monarchy. Since then, 7 individuals have served as governor-general.

Appointment

Unlike most other Commonwealth realms, the governor-general of Solomon Islands is nominated by the country's Parliament, rather than being proposed by its prime minister (as is the convention in the other Commonwealth realms). The appointment is made by the monarch of Solomon Islands following a simple majority vote of the National Parliament, although the monarch is not bound to accept that nomination for appointment.

The term of office is five years, and is renewable once.

Oath of office
The oath of office of the governor-general is:

Dismissal

The governor-general may be dismissed by the monarch, after an address from Parliament supported by at least two-thirds majority of the National Parliament.

If the office of governor-general becomes vacant, due to death or dismissal, the speaker of the National Parliament of Solomon Islands becomes acting governor-general until a new appointment is made. If the office of Speaker is vacant or unable to perform those functions, then the vice-regal duties are carried out by the by the Chief Justice.

Functions

Solomon Islands shares the person of the sovereign equally with 14 other countries in the Commonwealth of Nations. As the sovereign works and resides predominantly outside of Solomon Islands' borders, the governor-general's primary task is to perform the monarch's constitutional duties on his or her behalf. As such, the governor-general carries out his or her functions in the government of Solomon Islands on behalf and in the name of the Sovereign.

The governor-general's powers and roles are derive from the Constitution of Solomon Islands Part IV Sections 27, 28 & 29, and set out certain provisions relating to the governor-general.

Constitutional role

The governor-general is responsible for dissolving parliament and issues writs for new elections. After an election, the governor-general formally requests the leader of the political party which gains the support of a majority in parliament to form a government. The governor-general commissions the prime minister and appoints other ministers after the election.

The prime minister keeps the governor-general fully informed concerning the general conduct of the government of Solomon Islands and furnishes the governor-general with such information as the governor-general may request with respect to any particular matter relating to the government of Solomon Islands.

The governor-general, on the Sovereign's behalf, gives royal assent to laws passed by the National Parliament of Solomon Islands.

The governor-general acts on the advice of the Cabinet, to issue regulations, proclamations under existing laws, to appoint state judges, ambassadors and high commissioners to overseas countries, and other senior government officials.

The governor-general is also responsible for issuing Royal Commissions of Inquiry, and other matters, as required by particular legislation; and authorises many other executive decisions by ministers such as approving treaties with foreign governments.

The governor-general may, in certain circumstances, exercise without – or contrary to – ministerial advice. These are known as the reserve powers, and include:
appointing a prime minister if an election has resulted in a 'hung parliament'.
dismissing the prime minister who has lost the confidence of the parliament.
dismissing any minister acting unlawfully.
refusing to dissolve the House of Representatives despite a request from the prime minister.

Ceremonial role

The governor-general's ceremonial duties include opening new sessions of parliament by delivering the Speech from the Throne, welcoming visiting heads of state, and receiving the credentials of foreign diplomats.

The governor-general also presents honours at investitures to Solomon Islanders for notable service to the community, or for acts of bravery.

Community role

The governor-general provides non-partisan leadership in the community, acting as patron of charitable, service, sporting and cultural organisations, and attending functions throughout the country.

The governor-general also encourages, articulates and represents those things that unite Solomon Islanders together.

Privileges

Salary

The governor-general receives an annual salary of 130,000 SBD.

A governor-general's is at an annual rate of sixty per cent of the current salary payable to the incumbent.

Symbols

The governor-general uses a personal flag, which features a lion passant atop a St. Edward's royal crown with "Solomon Islands" written on a two-headed frigatebird, all on a blue background. It is flown on buildings and other locations in Solomon Islands to mark the governor-general's presence.

Residence

Government House in Honiara is the official residence of the governor-general of Solomon Islands.

Upon retirement, governors-general are provided with an official residence free of rent and the cost of water, gas, and electricity is paid for by the government.

List of governors-general
Following is a list of people who have served as Governor-General of Solomon Islands since independence in 1978.

See also
 List of resident commissioners and governors of the Solomon Islands, prior to the independence of Solomon Islands.

References

Government of the Solomon Islands
 
Solomon Islands
1978 establishments in the Solomon Islands